Martin A. Suhm (born 1962), is a German chemist and spectroscopist; he completed a Ph.D. thesis on the far infrared spectroscopy at ETH Zürich (group of Martin Quack) in 1990; he is a professor at the Institute of Physical Chemistry of the University of Göttingen since 1997 who is active in the field of intermolecular interactions studies; he was elected a member of the Academy of Sciences Leopoldina in 2012.

Works 
 Horizons in hydrogen bond research 2009. A collection of papers from the XVIIIth International Conference «Horizons in hydrogen bond research», Paris, France, 14–18 September 2009 / eds. Austin J. Barnes, Marie-Claire Bellissent-Funel, Martin A. Suhm. — Amsterdam, 2010.

Awards 
 Latsis University prize (1995)
 ADUC habilitation prize (1995)

See also 
 Roman M. Balabin
 Stefan Grimme

References

Sources

Literature

External links 
 

Living people
21st-century German chemists
Spectroscopists
Academic staff of the University of Göttingen
Members of the German Academy of Sciences Leopoldina
1962 births
People from Gengenbach